2-oxoglutarate dioxygenase (ethylene-forming) (ethylene-forming enzyme, EFE) is an enzyme with systematic name 2-oxoglutarate:oxygen oxidoreductase (decarboxylating, ethylene-forming). This enzyme catalyses the following chemical reaction

 2-oxoglutarate + O2  ethylene + 3 CO2 + H2O

2-oxoglutarate dioxygenase produces ethylene in bacteria of the Pseudomonas syringae group.

References

External links 
 

EC 1.13.12